Simone Masciarelli (born 2 January 1980 in Pescara) is a former Italian cyclist.

Major results

2001
2nd Gran Premio Nobili Rubinetterie
7th Trofeo Matteotti
2002
2nd Trofeo Città di Castelfidardo
5th GP Industria & Artigianato Larciano
5th Giro d'Oro
9th Giro del Friuli
2003
6th GP Fred Mengoni
7th Stausee-Rundfahrt Klingnau
9th Trofeo Città di Castelfidardo
2006
4th GP Industria & Commercio di Prato
5th Coppa Sabatini
6th Giro dell'Emilia
7th Memorial Cimurri

References

1980 births
Living people
Italian male cyclists
Sportspeople from Pescara
Cyclists from Abruzzo